Superman is second album by Gary Chaw, which is released on 27 December 2006. After the hit success in his first album 格格 Blue, he came out with his second album of the same name. This is the second album he released in the same year.

Track listing 
All songs composed by Gary Chaw; "我的甜蜜蜜" contains sample of Teresa Teng's famous song or Indonesian folk song "甜蜜蜜".
Lyricists are listed below.
Superman  Lyricist: 阿丹
兩隻戀人 (Liang Zhi Lian Ren)  Lyricist: 徐世珍
Girlfriend  Lyricist: 阿丹
背叛 (Bei Pan)  Lyricists: 阿丹 / 邬裕康
妳是我的寶貝 (Ni Shi Wo De Bao Bei)  Lyricist: Gary Chaw
3-7-20-1  Lyricist: 邬裕康
保護你 (Bao Hu Ni)  Lyricist: 徐世珍
愛到底 (Ai Dao Di)  Lyricist: 俞方
我的甜蜜蜜 (Wo De Tian Mi Mi)  Lyricist: Gary Chaw
天使忌妒的生活 (Tian Shi Ji Du De Sheng Huo)  Lyricist: 邬裕康

Translation 
Superman
Two Lovers
Girlfriend
Betrayal
You're My Baby
3-7-20-1 
Protect You
Love Till The End
My Sweetie
The Life That Angels Envy

External Links 
Superman (Gary Chaw album) - KKBOX
Superman (Gary Chaw album) - Spotify

2006 albums
Gary Chaw albums